The 2000–01 Bundesliga was the 38th season of the Bundesliga, Germany's premier football league. It began on 11 August 2000 and ended on 19 May 2001. FC Bayern Munich successfully defended their title after a last-minute Patrik Andersson goal denied Schalke 04 their first title.

Competition modus
Every team played two games against each other team, one at home and one away. Teams received three points for a win and one point for a draw. If two or more teams were tied on points, places were determined by goal difference and, if still tied, by goals scored. The team with the most points were crowned champions while the three teams with the fewest points were relegated to 2. Bundesliga.

Team changes to 1999–2000
SSV Ulm, Arminia Bielefeld and MSV Duisburg were relegated to the 2. Bundesliga after finishing in the last three places. They were replaced by 1. FC Köln, VfL Bochum and FC Energie Cottbus.

Season overview

Title race
The 2000–01 season was notable for its title race, which literally lasted until the last seconds of the campaign. Before the last round of matches, Bayern Munich lead Schalke 04 by three points, but with an inferior goal difference. Schalke managed to defeat Unterhaching, 5–3. Shortly before this match ended, Bayern gave up a 90th-minute goal against Hamburg. As the news spread quickly at the Parkstadion, most Schalke supporters believed their team had won their first championship since 1958. The pitch had thus already been stormed in celebration although the match in Hamburg was not concluded yet, which could also be seen on stadium television.

In Hamburg, Bayern tried one last attack in injury time when suddenly Hamburg goalkeeper Mathias Schober, who ironically was loaned out from Schalke, stopped a back pass by his teammate Tomáš Ujfaluši with his hands. Referee Markus Merk thus awarded an indirect free kick for Bayern about eight meters from the Hamburg goal. Discussions and protests led to a further delay before Patrik Andersson eventually scored the decisive equaliser, the only goal of his Bayern career, on a Stefan Effenberg tip pass. The match was never resumed afterwards.

In Schalke, the atmosphere immediately turned from joy and celebration to shock, disbelief and mourning. Because of the events, the Schalke 04 team of that season was dubbed "Champion of Hearts" by the German media.

Other events
Title combatants Bayern and Schalke both qualified for the 2001–02 UEFA Champions League while Borussia Dortmund and Bayer 04 Leverkusen achieved qualification round spots for the same competition. Hertha BSC and SC Freiburg ended their season with successful qualification for the 2001–02 UEFA Cup. European qualification was rounded out by Werder Bremen, VfL Wolfsburg and 1860 Munich, who entered the 2001 UEFA Intertoto Cup.

The 2000–01 DFB-Pokal was won by Schalke 04. As a consequence to Schalke's Champions League qualification, the UEFA Cup spot reserved for the domestic cup winner was awarded to finalists 1. FC Union Berlin, who played in the third-tier Regionalliga Nordost.

On the bottom end of the table, SpVgg Unterhaching, Eintracht Frankfurt and VfL Bochum had to face relegation to the 2. Bundesliga. Promoted for the new season were 2000–01 2. Bundesliga champions 1. FC Nürnberg, runners-up Borussia Mönchengladbach and third-placed FC St. Pauli.

In European competitions, Bayern Munich won the 2000–01 Champions League after beating Spanish sides Valencia CF on penalties. Aside from that, it was a rather meagre year for German teams. Hamburg and Leverkusen both exited Champions League at the first group stage, 1860 Munich even did not make the group stage at all by losing in the third qualifying round against Leeds United. All three teams were eventually moved over to the 2000–01 UEFA Cup, but neither of them advanced past the third round. From the "regular" UEFA Cup participants, Werder Bremen and Hertha BSC also exited in the third round, with Stuttgart following one round later. Only Kaiserslautern made it to the UEFA Cup semi-finals, but had no chance against another Spanish team, Deportivo Alavés.

Team overview

(*) Promoted from 2. Bundesliga.

League table

Results

Top goalscorers

Champion squad

References

External links
 DFB Bundesliga archive 2000/2001

Bundesliga seasons
1
Germany